Buranbayevo (Buranbay) is a rural locality (a village) in Tavlykayevsky Selsoviet, Baymaksky District, Bashkortostan, Russia. The population was 417 as of 2010. There are 5 streets.

Geography 
Buranbayevo is located 30 km northwest of Baymak (the district's administrative centre) by road. Chingizovo is the nearest rural locality.

References 

Rural localities in Baymaksky District